The 1984 Icelandic Cup was the 25th edition of the National Football Cup.

It took place between 23 May 1984 and 26 August 1984, with the final played at Laugardalsvöllur in Reykjavik. The cup was important, as winners qualified for the UEFA Cup Winners' Cup (if a club won both the league and the cup, the defeated finalists would take their place in the Cup Winners' Cup).

The 10 clubs from the 1. Deild entered in the last 16, with clubs from lower tiers entering in the three preliminary rounds. Teams played one-legged matches. In case of a draw, a penalty shoot-out took place (there were no replays, unlike in previous years).

ÍA Akranes retained their title by beating Fram Reykjavik (promoted to the 1. Deild that season) in the final. It was their fourth Icelandic Dup victory, and meant that they won the League-Cup double for the second consecutive season. The victory meant that it was the losing finalists who qualified for Europe.

First round

Second round

Third round

Fourth round 

 Entry of ten teams from the 1. Deild

Quarter finals

Semi finals

Final 

 ÍA Akranes won their fourth Icelandic Cup. As they also won the league, Fram Reykjavik qualified for the 1985–86 European Cup Winners' Cup.

See also 

 1984 Úrvalsdeild
 Icelandic Men's Football Cup

External links 
  1983 Icelandic Cup results at the site of the Icelandic Football Federation

Icelandic Men's Football Cup
Iceland
1984 in Iceland